Chajing Khunou (Meitei: ꯆꯥꯖꯤꯡ ꯈꯨꯅꯧ)is a small village situated within the Kakching district in the Indian state of Manipur.
It was first settled in the 1960s, by migrants from Lilong Chajing.

Sports

This village "Chajing khunou" have been significant place for Volleyball in state Manipur since 1980.The Chajing Khunou Welfare Club organized the First State Level Men's Volleyball under the aegis of All Manipur Volleyball Association starting 24 march and ends 28 march in 2019.
Hosting a major tournament in this village have been one of dreams of  villagers.

Religion 

Most people of this village follow the Sanamahi religion.

It has a sacred place, Ebhudhou Santhong Apanba, which is situated at a small hill, known as Chajing Khunou Laibung, to the north of the village and the neighbouring village of Korsantabi. The people of the village take part in Lai Haraoba (a festival of  worshipping or offering to God in community level in group) in the summer i.e. Kalen in Meitei Thapalon (calendar) which falls in May–June every year at Ebhudhou Santhong Apanba.

Food habits
Most people's of this village are non-vegetarian as most of people are Sanamahism religion.

See also
 Khongyam
 Sugnu
 Wangoo

References

Origin of Chajing Khunou (book)

External link

Villages in Kakching district